Karakütük is a village in Tarsus district of Mersin Province, Turkey. At  It is in the Toros Mountains and to the west of Turkish state highway . The population of village was 355 as of 2012. Main economic activity of the village is agriculture.

References

Villages in Tarsus District